A Reagan Democrat is a traditionally Democratic voter in the Northern United States, referring to working class residents who supported Republican presidential candidates Ronald Reagan in the 1980 or the 1984 presidential elections, or  George H. W. Bush during the 1988 presidential election.  The term Reagan Democrat remains part of the lexicon in American political jargon because of Reagan's continued widespread popularity among a large segment of the electorate.

Overview

During the 1980 election a dramatic number of voters in the United States, disillusioned with the economic malaise of the 1970s and the presidency of Jimmy Carter (even more than four years earlier moderate Republican Gerald Ford), supported former California governor and former Democrat Ronald Reagan. Reagan's optimistic tone managed to win over a broad set of voters to an almost unprecedented degree (for a Republican since moderate war hero Eisenhower's victories in 1952 and 1956) across the board, but did not make particular demographic inroads with Democratic voters, with the possible exception of national security voters (a focused yet relatively small group, difficult to find decisive empirical support for and identified in 1980 with Democrat Henry "Scoop" Jackson, a Reagan ally for a brief period after 1980 until his death in 1983).

The term Reagan Democrat is sometimes used to describe moderate Democrats who are more conservative than liberal on certain issues like national security and immigration. The term Reagan Democrat also refers to the vast sway that Reagan held over the House of Representatives during his presidency, even though the house had a Democratic majority during both of his terms. The term also hearkens back to Richard Nixon's silent majority, a concept that Ronald Reagan himself used during his political campaigns in the 1970s.

Democratic pollster Stan Greenberg issued a study of Reagan Democrats, analyzing white ethnic voters (largely unionized auto workers) in Macomb County, Michigan, just north of Detroit. The county voted 63 percent for John F. Kennedy in 1960, but 66 percent for Reagan in 1984. He concluded that Reagan Democrats no longer saw the Democratic party as champions of their working class aspirations, but instead saw them as working primarily for the benefit of others: the very poor, feminists, the unemployed, African Americans, Latinos and other groups. In addition, Reagan Democrats enjoyed gains during the period of economic prosperity that coincided with the Reagan administration following the "malaise" of the Carter administration. They also supported Reagan's strong stance on national security and opposed the 1980s Democratic Party on such issues as pornography, crime, and high taxes.

Greenberg periodically revisited the voters of Macomb County as a barometer of public opinion until he conducted a 2008 exit poll that found "nearly 60 percent" of Macomb County voters were comfortable' with Mr. Obama", drawing the conclusion that Macomb County had "become normal and uninteresting" and "illustrates America's evolving relationship with race". As such, Greenberg stated in an op-ed for The New York Times: "I'm finished with the Reagan Democrats of Macomb County in suburban Detroit after making a career of spotlighting their middle-class anger and frustrations about race and Democratic politicians". Obama ultimately won Macomb County by a comfortable 53–45% margin that year, the same margin he won nationally. In 2016, Macomb County voted for Donald Trump, and did so again in 2020.

Reagan biographer Craig Shirley also wrote extensively about Reagan Democrats. His 1980 election account "Rendezvous with Destiny" clearly distinguishes the appearance of blue-collar crossovers for Reagan during the 1980 Wisconsin primaries at a Reagan event in Milwaukee's "ethnic Mecca" Serb Hall: "A young Democrat, Robert Ponasik, stood on a chair furiously waving a handmade sign that proclaimed, 'Cross Over for Reagan'. Of the reaction to Reagan in Serb Hall, Lynn Sherr of ABC reported, 'In judging from the way they showed up at a long-time Democratic meeting hall [...] a large number of blue-collar voters could go for Reagan'".

Reagan Democrats in the 1990s and into the 21st century
The demographic shift that Reagan tapped into continued into the 1990s after he left office. The Democrats responded with new themes. This is evidenced by the rise of Bill Clinton to the presidency during the 1992 presidential election. In that campaign, candidate Clinton billed himself as "a different kind of Democrat" and forswore many older Democratic Party policies in favor of centrist Third Way policies that were championed by the Democratic Leadership Council in hopes of reconnecting with many working-class voters who had voted Republican in presidential campaigns since 1968—the silent majority of Nixon and the Reagan Democrats.

Many self-styled Reagan Democrats claim to be fiscal conservatives, but still support many aspects of the core programs of the New Deal and the Great Society while also supporting Reagan's strong defense policies as well as his optimism in American culture. Some elements of the Tea Party fit this sketch, but many other independents and Democrats could fall into the same category as well. It has become a broad term, but that does not diminish the explanatory power behind it. One of the most prominent self-styled Reagan Democrats includes the one-time Virginia Senator Jim Webb (who was in office from 2007 to 2013), whom columnist David Paul Kuhn asserts is the quintessential Reagan Democrat and one of the last of an "endangered species" within the Democratic Party.

Conservative commentator George Will, noting the long-term movements of partisanship, said in 2012 : "White voters without college education—economically anxious and culturally conservative—were called 'Reagan Democrats' when they were considered only seasonal Republicans because of Ronald Reagan. Today they are called the Republican base".

Trump and Biden

The term still carries relevance, since part of this group also defected to Donald Trump, in the 2016 presidential election, who won every swing state in the rust belt and became the first Republican candidate to win Pennsylvania and Michigan since 1988 and the first to win Wisconsin since 1984. All of these states voted for Reagan in 1980 and 1984, but voted for Democratic president Barack Obama in 2008 and 2012.

Following the 2016 presidential election, which saw many Rust Belt counties turn to Trump, a Republican strategist said that the working-class Reagan Democrats who favored Trump in 2016 should now be called "Trump Republicans". Conversely, it has been suggested that Reagan Democrats did not necessarily swing the Rust Belt states in 2016, but rather that Democratic voters in those regions stayed home on election day.

In a 2021 profile with Politico Magazine, Stan Greenberg used the term "Biden Republican" to identify a large bloc of suburban white collar voters who chose Joe Biden over Donald Trump in the 2020 presidential election. Greenberg highlighted that these voters have been reliably Republican for decades but were inclined to vote for the Democratic nominee because of the nativism of Trumpism.

Similar concepts internationally

 In the United Kingdom, the term "Essex man" can be used to describe a similar group of traditionally Labour-voting working-class voters who switched to voting for the Conservative Party led by Margaret Thatcher in the 1980s thanks to her Right to Buy policy in particular. While no name in particular has been given to this group, the 2017 general election saw some Brexit-supporting middle or northern working class areas swing disproportionally to the Conservative Party. For example, this was manifested in the Conservative candidates gaining part-urban Labour seats in Stoke-on-Trent, Middlesbrough and Walsall in spite of the general Labour gain nationwide and in pro-European Union areas and the general losses for the Conservatives. On the other hand, Essex was dominated by the Conservatives in that election, with the party winning all 18 seats. After a larger number of northern working class areas swung to the Conservatives in the 2019 election, polling companies dubbed this group of people Workington man. The trend intensified in the 2019 general election, where the red wall largely voted for the Conservatives in greater numbers. This resulted in some constituencies that had been Labour for a century electing a Conservative MP, while others turned Conservative for the first time. 
 In Australia, the term "Howard battler" was used to refer to suburban working-class and traditionally Labor voters who switched to the Liberal Party led by John Howard in the mid-1990s and carried the conservatives into victory for the first time since Malcolm Fraser in 1980.
 In New Zealand, political columnist Chris Trotter has theorised about the emergence of "Waitakere Man", a traditionally blue-collar constituency who he believes switched their votes to National Party leader John Key at the 2008 general election on the premises of "ambition" and "aspiration" and supposedly also represent a backlash against "political correctness gone mad".

See also

Crossing the floor
Democratic and liberal support for John McCain in 2008
Democrats for Nixon
Democrats for Trump
The Lincoln Project
Obama-Trump voters
Party switching in the United States
Republican and conservative support for Barack Obama in 2008
Swing voter

References

Further reading
 Borquez, Julio. "Partisan Appraisals of Party Defectors: Looking Back at the Reagan Democrats." American Review of Politics 26 (2005): 323-346. online

 Burden and Kimball (2002). Why Americans Split Their Tickets: Campaign, Competition, and Divided Government. Ann Arbor, MI: The University of Michigan Press.

 Coste, Françoise. "Ronald Reagan’s Northern Strategy and a new American Partisan Identity: The Case of the Reagan Democrats." Caliban. French Journal of English Studies 31 (2012): 221-238 online

 Douthat and Salam (2008). Grand New Party: How Republicans Can Win the Working Class and Save the American Dream. New York City, NY: Doubleday.

Return to Macomb County – Democratic Defection Revisited, by Stan Greenberg, April 01, 1987
From Crisis to Working Majority, by Stan Greenberg, September 21, 1991
Back To Macomb: Reagan Democrats and Barack Obama, by Stan Greenberg, James Carville, Andrew Baumann, Karl Agne, and Jesse Contario, August 25, 2008
 Greenberg, Stanley B. (November 11, 2008). "Goodbye, Reagan Democrats". The New York Times.
 Moore, Jonathan (1986). Campaign For President: The Managers Look at ’84. Dover, MA: Auburn House Publishing.
 Schoen, Douglas (2008). Declaring Independence. New York City, NY: Random House.
 Steed, Moreland, and Baker (1986). The 1984 Presidential Election in the South: Patterns of the Southern Party Politics. New York City, NY: Praeger Publishers.
 Texieria, Ruy (2008). Red, Blue, & Purple America: The Future of Election Demographics. Washington, DC: Brooking Institution Press.

Political history of the United States
Political terminology of the United States
Ronald Reagan
White American culture
Right-wing populism in the United States
Working class in the United States
Factions in the Democratic Party (United States)
Socioeconomic stereotypes